Tini "Whetu" Marama Tirikatene-Sullivan  (9 January 1932 – 20 July 2011) was a New Zealand politician. She was an MP from 1967 to 1996, representing the Labour Party and was New Zealand’s first Māori woman cabinet minister. At the time of her retirement, she was the second longest-serving MP in Parliament, being in her tenth term of office. She was one of twenty holders of the Order of New Zealand, the highest honour of the country.

Early life
Whetu Marama Tirikatene was born on 9 January 1932, the daughter of Eruera Tirikatene and Ruti Tirikatene. Her iwi are Ngāi Tahu and Ngāti Kahungunu. She was raised at Rātana Pā by her grandmother, dress designer and tailor Amiria Henrici Solomon. Educated at Rangiora High School and Wellington East Girls' College, she excelled in dancing, winning the New Zealand amateur Latin American ballroom dancing championship with her Australian partner Kevin Mansfield, and was also accomplished in fencing, becoming one of the top four female fencers in the country. She studied for a PhD in political science at the Australian National University, with the topic "Contemporary Maori Political Involvement". While there, she met Denis Sullivan, a physics PhD student who later became an associate professor in physics and astrophysics at Victoria University of Wellington, and they were married in Canberra on 18 March 1967.

Member of Parliament

When their father Sir Eruera Tirikatene died in 1967 many expected Te Rino to succeed him as MP for Southern Maori. As Te Rino was part-Maori and entitled to choose between being on the Maori and European electoral rolls, at the time of the by-election he was registered on the European roll in Rangiora where he had to remain under the electoral act until the next general election, which made it unlikely he would be eligible as a candidate in Southern Maori. With her brother effectively ruled out, attention turned to Tirikatene (studying in Australia at the time) as the likely Labour candidate for the seat. She was eventually selected as Labour's candidate.

She duly was elected to succeed her father in Parliament at the Southern Maori by-election of 1967. Between 1972 and 1975, she was the Minister of Tourism. In addition, she was Associate minister of Social Welfare from 1972 to 1974. She was Minister for the Environment from 1974 to 1975. She was re-elected by substantial majorities until the 1996 election, when the Southern Maori electorate was abolished in the transition to MMP. Tirikatene-Sullivan then contested the new Te Tai Tonga electorate, which covered much of the same territory as the old Southern Maori electorate, but she was narrowly defeated by Tu Wyllie of New Zealand First. She subsequently retired from politics.

In 1970, Tirikatene-Sullivan became the second woman to give birth whilst an MP. She later became the first (both in New Zealand and the Commonwealth) cabinet minister to give birth to a child.

On 6 February 1993, Tirikatene-Sullivan was appointed a Member of the Order of New Zealand, the highest civilian award given by the New Zealand government. The same year, she was awarded the New Zealand Suffrage Centennial Medal. She died in Wellington on 20 July 2011.

Legacy
Tirikatene-Sullivan was the youngest Māori woman elected at the time, she was also the first Māori woman to be a cabinet minister, and the first sitting MP to give birth in New Zealand. In 2016, her portrait was raised alongside Iriaka Ratana in the New Zealand Parliament Buildings at Mātangireia. The portraits were hung with a special ceremony held to commemorate them, with extended family attending the ceremony. Tirikatene-Sullivan's 29 years representing Southern Maori was the longest at the time, and was only surpassed by Annette King's 30 years as the longest-serving women in New Zealand's Parliament.

Tirikatene-Sullivan was particularly known for her style of dress, often wearing fashionable outfits rather than the suits many professional women wore at the time. She was a patron of the arts, and she commissioned garments from contemporary Māori artists. These included artists like Sandy Adsett, Para Matchitt, Cliff Whiting, and Frank Davis. The Māori motifs that were incorporated into her outfits was unique for the time, and exposed New Zealanders to a new expression of Māori art. Tirikatene-Sullivan was acutely aware that her style of dress and design choice served as a political statement, and was conscious of the transformative power her style of dress served. As Minister of Tourism, she took her unique style to locations such as Australia's Sydney Opera House, where she exhibited her Tania evening gown featuring a kowhaiwhai motif on a global stage. Her collection of outfits was exhibited at MTG Hawke's Bay at an exhibition titled Whetu Tirikatene-Sullivan: Travel in Style.

Notes

References

Women in Parliamentary Life 1970-1990: Hocken Lecture 1993 by Marilyn Waring, page 36-37 (Hocken Library, University of Otago, 1994) 

1932 births
2011 deaths
New Zealand MPs for Māori electorates
Members of the Order of New Zealand
Ngāi Tahu people
Ngāti Kahungunu people
New Zealand Labour Party MPs
Women members of the New Zealand House of Representatives
Members of the New Zealand House of Representatives
Unsuccessful candidates in the 1996 New Zealand general election
People educated at Rangiora High School
People educated at Wellington East Girls' College
Recipients of the New Zealand Suffrage Centennial Medal 1993